San Lorenzo, officially the Municipality of San Lorenzo, is a 5th class municipality in the province of Guimaras, Philippines. According to the 2020 census, it has a population of 29,444 people.

San Lorenzo was created by virtue of Republic Act No. 7897 out of Jordan, Guimaras on February 20, 1995. It is known for its wind farms. In addition, San Lorenzo celebrates Foundation Day for its creation every February.

San Lorenzo is a part of the Metro Iloilo–Guimaras area, centered on Iloilo City.

Geography

Barangays
San Lorenzo is politically subdivided into 12 barangays.

 Aguilar
 Cabano (Poblacion)
 Cabungahan
 Constancia
 Gaban
 Igcawayan
 M. Chavez
 San Enrique (Lebas)
 Sapal
 Sebario
 Suclaran
 Tamborong

Climate

Demographics

Economy

References

External links
 [ Philippine Standard Geographic Code]
Philippine Census Information

Municipalities of Guimaras